Teresa Madruga (born 18 March 1953) is a Portuguese actress. She has appeared in 71 films and television shows since 1977. She starred in the 1983 film In the White City, which was entered into the 33rd Berlin International Film Festival.

Selected filmography
 Francisca (1981)
 In the White City (1983)
 Dead Man's Seat (1984)
 Manoel's Destinies (1985)
 Day of Despair (1992)
 Abraham's Valley (1993)
 Sostiene Pereira (1996)
 Get a Life (2001)
 Tabu (2012)
 Imagine (2012)
 Will-o'-the-Wisp (Fogo-Fátuo) - 2022

References

External links

1953 births
Living people
Portuguese film actresses
People from Faial Island
Portuguese television actresses
20th-century Portuguese actresses
21st-century Portuguese actresses